Trinity Methodist Episcopal Church and Rectory is a historic Methodist Episcopal church and rectory located at Poughkeepsie, Dutchess County, New York.  The church was built in 1892, and is a Romanesque Revival style brick and stone church. It features a massive hexagonal tower with castellated elements and an opern belfry.  The rectory was also built in 1892, and is a -story Queen Anne style dwelling.

It was listed on the National Register of Historic Places in 1982.

References

Episcopal church buildings in New York (state)
Churches on the National Register of Historic Places in New York (state)
Romanesque Revival architecture in New York (state)
Queen Anne architecture in New York (state)
Churches completed in 1892
19th-century Episcopal church buildings
Churches in Poughkeepsie, New York
National Register of Historic Places in Poughkeepsie, New York